Dwayne John Peel (born 31 August 1981) is a Welsh rugby union coach and former player. He was the most capped scrum-half for the Wales national rugby union team with 76 caps, until his record was surpassed by Mike Phillips on 16 March 2013.

Youth and early career
Peel was born in Carmarthen, Wales. He started his rugby career playing for Tumble RFC at Under-8s level. He attended Ysgol Gyfun Maes-yr-Yrfa in Cefneithin, and is a fluent Welsh speaker. He made his professional club debut for Llanelli RFC before joining the Llanelli Scarlets region at its creation in 2003.

International
Peel made his international debut for Wales in 2001 against Japan. He was still on his geography degree course at the Swansea University at the time. During his time at Swansea University, he became friends with Edward Lewsey – a Welsh Under-21 international, and brother of England international Josh Lewsey. Peel has since scored five tries (25 points) scoring his debut Test try against Italy in 2003 for Wales.

In 2005, Peel was selected for the British & Irish Lions tour to New Zealand, and was the youngest Lion on the tour. On 9 September 2007, Peel was captain for Wales when they beat Canada 42–17 in their opening match in the 2007 Rugby World Cup.

On 15 January 2008, it was announced by the Scarlets that Peel would be joining Sale Sharks at the end of the 2007–08 season. 
Peel joined, on a three-year contract, at the start of the 2008–09 season.

New Wales coach Warren Gatland later stated that Peel would be an exception to his desired policy to select players from those playing for Welsh clubs, but on 19 January 2009 it was announced that Peel would not be part of the Welsh squad for the 2009 Six Nations Championship. Peel was subsequently called into the squad, however, as cover for injured Gareth Cooper and on 8 February 2009 played in the second half of Wales' opening match against Scotland.

In the 2012-2013 Premiership season, Peel was involved in the 32-9 win on 12 April against Gloucester, scoring two tries. He was also named in the Barbarians squad for the 2013 Summer internationals, to play against England and the British & Irish Lions.

Peel then signed for Bristol Rugby for the 2014–15 season, being appointed club captain in the process playing alongside Welsh internationals Ryan Jones and Ian Evans.

International tries

Coaching
On 15 February 2017, Ulster announced Peel would join them as assistant coach from the start of the 2017–18 season on a two-year contract.

Peel was due to join the Cardiff Blues for the 2021–22 season as senior assistant coach responsible for attack.

However, Peel joined the Scarlets as head coach for the 2021–22 season instead.

References

External links
profile at WRU.co.uk

1981 births
Living people
Rugby union players from Carmarthen
Rugby union scrum-halves
Welsh rugby union coaches
Welsh rugby union players
Wales international rugby union players
British & Irish Lions rugby union players from Wales
Llanelli RFC players
Scarlets players
Sale Sharks players
Bristol Bears players
Ulster Rugby non-playing staff
Scarlets coaches
Wales rugby union captains